The Chicago Pride Parade, also colloquially (and formerly) called the Chicago Gay Pride Parade or PRIDE Chicago, is the annual pride parade held on the last Sunday of June in Chicago, Illinois in the United States. It is considered the culmination of the larger Gay and Lesbian Pride Month in Chicago, as promulgated by the Chicago City Council and Mayor of Chicago. Chicago's Pride Parade is one of the largest by attendance in the world. The event takes place outside and celebrates Equal Rights for lesbian, gay, bisexual, transgender and queer people, which is also known as the celebration of LGBTQ rights.

Background

The first parade was organized on Saturday, June 27, 1970, as a march from Washington Square Park ("Bughouse Square") to the Water Tower, but then many of the participants spontaneously marched on to the Civic Center (now Richard J. Daley) Plaza. For many years, the parade was held only in Lake View East, a neighborhood enclave of the Lakeview community area. Recent parades have expanded their outreach (and ability to handle crowds) by extending the route into the Uptown neighborhood, beginning at the corner of Broadway and Montrose. The parade then proceeds south on Broadway to Halsted, continues south on Halsted to Belmont, then east on Belmont to Broadway and finally south again on Broadway to Cannon Drive and Lincoln Park.

With the increasing political participation of gay, lesbian, bisexual and transgender Americans and the community's relatively high financial resources through political action groups and as individual donors, Illinois politicians have increased their presence at the Chicago Pride Parade. Both the Illinois Democratic and Republican parties have been heavily represented, most noticeably by former Governor Rod Blagojevich, a Democrat, and former Treasurer Judy Baar Topinka, a Republican. Both had strong support from many gay and lesbian voters.

On June 28, 2009, more than 500,000 spectators watched the 40th Annual Chicago Pride Parade. Among the entries were several marching bands, dance troupes, twirlers, and many political figures. The 2010 parade featured an appearance from the Chicago Blackhawks' Brent Sopel and the Stanley Cup as part of the Chicago Gay Hockey Association's float. Sopel appeared in the parade to honor Brendan Burke, the gay son of the Maple Leafs' GM Brian Burke. Due to Chicago being one of the largest cities with a massive sports community, some other special guests have attended the Gay Pride Parade in Chicago, those include David Kopay (NFL running back), Billy Bean (major league outfielder) and Greg Louganis (Olympic diver).

The 2011 parade included 250 entries and was attended by over 800,000 spectators, almost double the previous year, causing massive overcrowding and resulted in a reorganization of the parade route for the 2012 parade. Starting in 2013 the Chicago Pride Parade has reached over one million people each year, and the number continues to grow.

In October 2019, Richard Pfeiffer, director of the Parade since 1974, died.

The parade was cancelled in 2020 due to the COVID-19 pandemic. The 2021 parade was postponed to October 3, 2021, in the hopes that an in-person parade could be held. Due to Delta variant, on September 3, 2021, the parade was cancelled once again due to COVID-19. Organizers aim for the event to return in 2022 with its original scheduling.

Pre Parade Celebration 
The year 2019 marked the 19th Annual Pre Parade Celebration, also known as Chicago's two day long Pride Festival. 2019's Chicago Pride Festival saw over 100,000 people, the festival is held on the Saturday and Sunday before the Pride Parade. Each year there is a suggested ten dollar donation while entering the festival for LGBTQ fundraisers, events, etc. The festival is open rain or shine and each year it is held in Boystown, this year it was located on Halsted Street from Addison to Grace Street. The streets are blocked off from traffic so the celebration can take place throughout the streets all weekend long. Each year there are multiple different performers performing on the three  main stages at the festival, some of this years performers included Betty Who, LeAnn Rimes, Pabllo Vittar, Alex Newell and Inaya Day. The Pre Parade Celebration is just one of the many events held in Boystown in the month of June.

Dates and Attendance

Weather 
The Chicago Pride Parade is held on the last Sunday in June, so the weather  is usually hot. The average high temperature at O'Hare Airport for the parade day since 1970 is 83 degrees; the average low is 61 degrees; and 22% of parade days have seen measurable precipitation. The warmest pride parade was 99 degrees in 1983, and the wettest pride parade was in 1978 when 0.92 inches of rain fell.

See also

 LGBT culture in Chicago
Pride Parade

References

External links
 www.chicagopridecalendar.org — parade's official website
Chicago Pride Fest
 chicagopride.gopride.com — comprehensive information and history about the parade and festival weekend, entries and performers

Festivals in Chicago
LGBT events in Illinois
LGBT culture in Chicago
Pride parades in the United States
1970 establishments in Illinois
Recurring events established in 1970
Articles containing video clips